The Compagnie de la France équinoxiale (Equinoctial France Company), or Compagnie de l'establissement des colonies françoises dans les terres fermes de l'Amerique, was a French enterprise formed in 1651 to colonize equatorial South America.
The enterprise soon failed.
In 1663 it was relaunched, but the next year was merged into a general company for all French possessions in the Americas.
The colony of Cayenne, the nucleus of French Guiana, was eventually secured in 1674.

Background

"Equinoctial France" (France équinoxiale) was the name given to the part of South America between the Orinoco and Amazon River – the Guianas.
The French government gave several companies the right of commerce and navigation in these countries.
The first was given to the merchants of Rouen in 1633 and confirmed by letters patent in 1638.
Settlements were founded at the mouth of the Cayenne River in 1634 and 1636.

In 1643, a new company was formed in Rouen called the Compagnie du cap du Nord, which obtained letters patent that ceded it all the land between the Orinoco and the Amazon.
It was headed by Charles Poncet de Brétigny.
Poncet de Brétigny led a group of colonists to Cayenne Island, where he disembarked on 4 March 1644 and collected those who remained of the first settlers.
The first wooden Fort Cépérou was built on a hill beside the river's estuary and a village was built below it.
Brétigny was ruthless and despotic, and terrorized both the colonists and the indigenous people.
The next year Brétigny  and most of the Europeans were killed by the Caribs, and the village of Cayenne was destroyed.

First company

The first Compagnie de la France équinoxiale was given the same privileges as the Compagnie du cap du Nord towards the end of 1651.
It was led by  twelve seigneurs.
Also known as the Compagnie de l’Amerique Equinoxial, it was a Paris-based joint stock company sponsored by notables such as the Abbé Marivault of the Sorbonne, the Sieur le Roux de Royville from Normandy, La Boulaye, Secretary of the Marine, and Jean-Jacques Dolu, grand audiencier at the court and intendant of New France in 1620.
The company recruited 800 colonists, male and female, to settle in Guiana.

The priest Antoine Biet took part in the expedition as a chaplain, and describes it in his Voyage de la France équinoxiale en l'isle de Cayenne entrepris par les françois en l'année M. DC. LII. (Paris, 1664).
Abbé Marivault drowned during the embarkation at Honfleur.
Balthazar Le Roux de Royville, who led the expedition, was assassinated by the sailors and thrown overboard during the voyage.
In September 1652 the expedition reached the tip of the Pointe du Mahury on the Island of Cayenne, where they found the 25 survivors of the earlier settlement.

A Monsieur de Navarre was in command of Fort Cépérou. 
He had arrived there from France about six months earlier, and was a first sergeant. 
He was promoted to lieutenant for surrendering the fort to the new arrivals.
Jean de Laon, a king' engineer, replaced the wooden walls of the fort with a stone bastion called Fort Saint Michel to guard against attacks from the Caribs across the river, and attacks by the English and Dutch.
There were violent disputes among the colonists and between them and the local Kalina people.
The attempt to found a colony ended in failure.
Of the 700 colonists just over 100 survived and escaped to Suriname in January 1654, then to Barbados.
The company went bankrupt when it emerged that it was not backed by the king.

Interlude

A Dutch soldier, Guerin Spranger, obtained a grant from the States General of the Netherlands and established a Dutch colony on Cayenne Island around 1656.
He arrived after the French had abandoned the island.
The Dutch established plantations and Spranger had begun a profitable trade with the Netherlands when the French decided to regain control, despite being at peace with the Netherlands at the time.

Second company

The second Compagnie de la France équinoxiale was formed in 1663.
The minister Jean-Baptiste Colbert conceived the idea of a new Compagnie de la France équinoxiale, and King Louis XIV of France approved the project.
The new company had a capital of 200,000 francs, and all the privileges that had been granted to the first.

Antoine Lefèbvre de La Barre, former intendant of the Bourbonnais and a very able man, was appointed governor of Cayenne.
He left the port of La Rochelle, France, on 26 February 1664 with two warships and 400 soldiers.
He was carried on a fleet commanded by Alexandre de Prouville de Tracy.
The expedition included 1,200 settlers.
Lefèbvre arrived in Cayenne on 11 May 1664.
On 15 May 1664 the Dutch general Spranger agreed to capitulate.

Lefèbvre de La Barre established a garrison at Fort Cépérou and started construction of a settlement of 200 huts.
He made a treaty with the indigenous people and began colonization in very favourable circumstances.
However, the enterprise soon ran into serious difficulty.

Successors

In 1664, Louis XIV revoked all the concessions made to specific companies and created a general company for all the American colonies named the Compagnie des Indes Occidentales.
The Compagnie de la France équinoxiale was merged into the Compagnie des Indes occidentales, and Lefèbvre de La Barre was recalled to take charge of the new enterprise.
De la Barre was made governor of Cayenne and of the Antilles.
However, the English and the Dutch captured the French establishments, and it was not until 1674 that Marshall Jean II d'Estrées restored French power in Guiana.
Louis XIV took all the colonies into his domain in 1674, and the governors were now royal officers.

Notes

Citations

Sources

French colonization of the Americas